Üçpınar can refer to:

 Üçpınar, Araç
 Üçpınar, Çüngüş
 Üçpınar, Keban
 Üçpınar, Lapseki
 Üçpınar, Polatlı
 Üçpınar, Tercan